Mickey Mouse (a.k.a. Mickey Mouse Shorts) is an American animated comedy television series produced by Disney Television Animation. Featuring Disney cartoon characters Mickey Mouse, Minnie Mouse, Donald Duck, Daisy Duck, Goofy and Pluto in contemporary settings such as Paris, Venice, Tokyo and New York, the series has the slapstick feel of the earliest Mickey Mouse shorts while providing a modern update, and "presents Mickey in a broad range of humorous situations that showcase his pluck and rascality, along with his long-beloved charm and good heartedness". The animation is provided by Mercury Filmworks.

The series was developed by artist Paul Rudish, who was the co-creator of the Cartoon Network television series Sym-Bionic Titan and is also the series' executive producer and supervising director, while Joseph Holt is the series' art director. Paul Rudish, Jenny Gase-Baker and Joseph Holt won three Emmy Awards for their work on the series in September 2013.

The pilot episode, "Croissant de Triomphe", was first released as a special preview on March 12, 2013, on Disney.com. The series officially premiered on June 28 of that year on Disney Channel, followed by the releases on Disney.com and Watch Disney Channel. A total of 18 episodes aired in the first season while the second season, premiering on April 11, 2014, consisting of 19 episodes. The third season premiered on July 17, 2015, with 20 episodes aired. The fourth season premiered on June 9, 2017, with 19 episodes aired. The fifth (later final) season of the original series premiered on October 6, 2018, with 18 episodes aired.

The series was succeeded with The Wonderful World of Mickey Mouse, which premiered on Disney+, on November 18, 2020, to coincide with Mickey's 92nd birthday.

Voice cast
 Chris Diamantopoulos as Mickey Mouse
 Diamantopoulos was cast instead of Bret Iwan, because the producers wanted a voice that sounded similar to the one used by Walt Disney for Walt's portrayal of Mickey.
 However, Iwan voices Mickey in the app game Where's My Mickey?
 Russi Taylor as Minnie Mouse and Huey, Dewey, and Louie
 Tony Anselmo as Donald Duck
 Bill Farmer as Goofy and Pluto
 Tress MacNeille as Daisy Duck and Chip
 Jim Cummings as Pete
 Corey Burton as Ludwig Von Drake and Dale
 April Winchell as Clarabelle Cow
 Alan Young (2015–16) and John Kassir (2016–18) as Scrooge McDuck

Cameos

Episodes

Broadcast
As of March 2014, a total of 100 million viewers in the United States had seen the series, and it was airing in 160 countries. As of June 2014, the show, translated in 34 languages, had reached over 135 million viewers worldwide.

Home media

Awards and nominations

Theme park attractions

A Mickey Mouse-themed attractions, Mickey & Minnie's Runaway Railway and Vacation Fun - An Original Animated Short with Mickey & Minnie, replaced The Great Movie Ride and Star Wars: Path of the Jedi at Disney's Hollywood Studios at Walt Disney World Resort in Orlando, Florida. This attraction was also announced to open at the Mickey's Toontown section of Disneyland at the Disneyland Resort for a planned 2023 opening date in Anaheim, California. The attraction is the third Mickey Mouse-themed attraction at any Disney property worldwide, only behind Mickey's PhilharMagic, directly based on the series and involves guests watching the premiere of a new Mickey Mouse cartoon and then entering the cartoon itself. The show's creative team, including Paul Rudish, Joseph Holt and composer Christopher Willis, collaborated with Walt Disney Imagineering to create the attractions, which opened on March 4, 2020, at Disney's Hollywood Studios.

Notes

References

External links
 
 
 
 Review of "Croissant de Triomphe" at FLIP animation magazine Retrieved March 2013

2010s American animated television series
2010s American children's comedy television series
2013 American television series debuts
2019 American television series endings
American children's animated comedy television series
Annie Award winners
Disney Channel original programming
Emmy Award-winning programs
English-language television shows
Mickey Mouse television series
Television series by Disney Television Animation
Television series created by Paul Rudish